Turkmenistan competed at the 2018 Asian Para Games held in Jakarta, Indonesia from 6 to 13 October 2018. In total, athletes representing Turkmenistan won one bronze medal and the country finished in 33rd place in the medal table.

Medalist

Medal by Sport

Medalist

Powerlifting 

Sergey Meladze won the bronze medal in the men's 72 kg event.

See also 
 Turkmenistan at the 2018 Asian Games

References 

Nations at the 2018 Asian Para Games
Turkmenistan at the Asian Para Games
2018 in Turkmenistani sport